SARM Division No. 4 is a division of the Saskatchewan Association of Rural Municipalities (SARM) within the province of Saskatchewan, Canada.  It is located in the north east area of the province. There are 43 rural municipalities in this division. The current director for Division 4 is Harvey Malanowich.

List of Rural Municipalities in SARM Division No. 4

by numerical RM #

 RM No. 241 Calder
 RM No. 243 Wallace
 RM No. 244 Orkney
 RM No. 245 Garry
 RM No. 246 Ituna Bon Accord
 RM No. 247 Kellross
 RM No. 248 Touchwood
 RM No. 271 Cote
 RM No. 273 Sliding Hills
 RM No. 274 Good Lake
 RM No. 275 Insinger
 RM No. 276 Foam Lake
 RM No. 277 Emerald
 RM No. 278 Kutawa
 RM No. 301 St. Philips
 RM No. 303 Keys
 RM No. 304 Buchanan
 RM No. 305 Invermay
 RM No. 307 Elfros
 RM No. 308 Big Quill
 RM No. 331 Livingston
 RM No. 333 Clayton
 RM No. 334 Preeceville
 RM No. 335 Hazel Dell
 RM No. 336 Sasman
 RM No. 337 Lakeview
 RM No. 338 Lakeside
 RM No. 366 Kelvington
 RM No. 367 Ponass Lake
 RM No. 368 Spalding
 RM No. 394 Hudson Bay
 RM No. 395 Porcupine
 RM No. 397 Barrier Valley
 RM No. 398 Pleasantdale
 RM No. 426 Bjorkdale
 RM No. 427 Tisdale
 RM No. 428 Star City
 RM No. 456 Arborfield
 RM No. 457 Connaught
 RM No. 458 Willow Creek
 RM No. 486 Moose Range
 RM No. 487 Nipawin
 RM No. 488 Torch River

Footnotes

External links
SARM Division No. 4 members

SARM divisions of Saskatchewan